Liu Jing (born 17 January 1997) is a Chinese footballer currently playing as a defender for Hebei China Fortune.

Club career
Liu Jing was promoted to the senior team of Hebei China Fortune within the 2019 Chinese Super League season and would make his debut in a league game on 2 August 2019 against Beijing Sinobo Guoan F.C. in a 2-0 defeat.

Career statistics

References

External links

1997 births
Living people
Chinese footballers
Association football defenders
Hebei F.C. players
Chinese Super League players